Antiquaobatis is an extinct genus of ray from the Early Jurassic (Late Pliensbachian) of Europe, containing the single species A. grimmenensis. It is the oldest known described member of the Rajiformes, and is based on a single tooth from Pliensbachian of Northern Germany. It was recovered from the Grimmen Clay Pit, on Spinatum strata that belongs in the region to the Komorowo Formation.  The holotype is a single antero-lateral tooth, very small and slightly asymmetrical, measuring 0.25 mm in maximum height and 0.26 mm in maximum width, that has an overall morphology, that suggests a consistent referral to Batomorphii, encompassing all skates and rays. The tooth has an overall rather gracile crown morphology, different from any other know jurassic batomorphs, indicating closest affinities to the monotypic genus Engaibatis schultzei from the Kimmeridgian-Tithonian of Tanzania.

Paleoenvironment
The Late Pliensbachian level of the Grimmen clay pit was trougth to be part of the Allenstein (Komorowo Formation), but due to be composed by sandstones there was a strong disagreement linking the fluvial Olsztyn with Germany, as comes from the Mazury area -easternmost part of the Polish basin and there is no link with the local Amaltheenton Beds, unlike the Komorowo Formation. The described tooth of Antiquaobatis is considered to come from  allochthonous origin, as it has suffered massively from post-mortem breakage in many cases, most probably due to extensive reworking and redistribution generated by current activities. This taxon probably lived on the   marine areas that were located in closer proximity to the Fennoscandian mainland, such as the paralic depositional environments of the Sorthat Formation of Bornholm, Denmark. But also can have been moved from the Polish Basin, as on the deposition of this Tooth it was flooded by the sea, as proven by the find on ammonites on central Poland.

Antiquaobatis grimmenensis appears to have used different, less specialized and probably more opportunistic feeding strategies, as suggested by the gracile and high tooth morphology.

References

Prehistoric cartilaginous fish genera
Jurassic cartilaginous fish
Early Jurassic fish
Jurassic fish of Europe
Rajiformes
Monotypic fish genera